The Guelph Treasure (German: Welfenschatz) is a collection of medieval ecclesiastical art originally housed at Brunswick Cathedral in Braunschweig, Germany. The Treasure takes its name from the princely House of Guelph (German: Welf) of Brunswick-Lüneburg.

In October 1929, the Treasure, consisting of 82 pieces, was sold by the former Duke of Brunswick to a consortium of Jewish art dealers. In 1935, in the Netherlands, they sold its major portion to agents of Hermann Göring, the second most powerful man in Nazi Germany.

After World War II, the art dealers' heirs unsuccessfully sought the restitution of the treasure. In Germany, the Limbach Commission, a government advisory body, found that there were no grounds for restitution, and in the U.S., the Supreme Court ruled in the 2021 case Germany v. Phillipp that the U.S. courts had no jurisdiction over the restitution claims.

History
The Guelph Treasure was originally housed at Brunswick Cathedral in Braunschweig, Germany. Most of the objects were removed from the cathedral in the 17th century and passed into the hands of John Frederick, Duke of Brunswick-Lüneburg, in 1671, and remained in the Court Chapel at Hannover until 1803.

In 1929 Ernest Augustus, former Duke of Brunswick, Head of House of Hanover, sold 82 items to a consortium of Frankfurt art dealers Saemy Rosenberg, Isaak Rosenbaum, Julius Falk Goldschmidt and Zacharias Hackenbroch for the price of 7.5 million Reichsmark.

Items from the Treasure were exhibited in the United States in 1930–31. Cleveland Museum of Art purchased nine pieces and more were sold to other museums and private collectors.

In 1935 the remaining 42 pieces of the collection were sold for 4.25 million Reichsmarks in a transaction in the Netherlands to agents of Hermann Göring, the second most powerful man in Nazi Germany. It is claimed that, in turn, Göring personally presented the Treasure as a gift to Adolf Hitler, although this is disputed by the Limbach Commission. It was then placed on display in the Bode Museum in Berlin, where it remains.

Restitution claims

Proceedings in Germany 
In 2008 a case for restitution was lodged in Germany by the heirs of the Jewish art dealers over the pieces sold in 1934. In March 2014 the Limbach Commission, an advisory body to the German government, concluded that the treasure should not be handed over as the case did not meet the criteria defining a forced sale due to Nazi persecution. This determination was based on historical facts, which have been verified by source materials. This, among other points, included the fact that since 1930 the Guelph Treasure had been located outside Germany, and the German state had no access to it at any time during the sales negotiations. Additionally the purchase price paid was within the scope of what was usual and achievable on the art market at the time and the sellers received the agreed purchase price.

U.S. court case 

In February 2015, the heirs to the Jewish art dealers sued Germany and the Bode Museum (via the Prussian Cultural Heritage Foundation) in the United States District Court for the District of Columbia in order to recover the treasure, citing that the Foreign Sovereign Immunities Act (FSIA) enables them to sue Germany in United States courts for compensation of property taken from the dealers as "rights in property taken in violation of international law". A few days before, Germany declared the collection for a national cultural treasure, meaning the art pieces can no longer leave the country without the explicit permission of the country's culture minister. It is unclear if the German Culture Minister Monika Grütters was aware of the US lawsuit at the time of the announcement.

Germany sought to dismiss the case, arguing that FSIA did not apply to the sale of goods that did not cross any international borders. The District Court denied the motion to dismiss, which was upheld at the United States Court of Appeals for the District of Columbia Circuit. Germany petitioned to the United States Supreme Court to rule on the matter. The Supreme Court certified Germany's petition, and heard the case in December 2020. In February 2021, the Court ruled in a unanimous decision that the heirs could not sue Germany under FSIA since the provision related to "rights in property taken" was limited to actions between foreign states, and not between states and individuals. However, the Supreme Court remanded the case back to lower courts on the basis that there may be other options whereby the heirs could seek compensation from Germany.

See also
 Gospels of Henry the Lion
 Herzog August Library

References

Further reading
 Der Gertrudistragaltar aus dem Welfenschatz: Eine stilgeschichtliche Untersuchung. Schriften des Dom-Museums Hildesheim. 2001

External links
 Bloomberg: "Jewish Dealers’ Heirs Claim Treasure Bought by Goering"
 Tablet: "Jewish Heirs Lay Claim to German Treasure"
 The Times of Israel: "Heirs seek return of 'cursed' $200m golden treasure bought for Hitler"

History of Brunswick
Culture in Braunschweig

Medieval art
Romanesque art
Treasure
Medieval European metalwork objects
Objects of the Berlin State Museums
Art and cultural repatriation after World War II
Church treasuries